Esh Winning Football Club is a football club based in Esh Winning, near Durham, in County Durham, England.

History
The original Esh Winning club was established in 1889 as Esh Winning Rangers. After playing in local leagues, they joined the Northern League in 1912, winning it at the first attempt, also winning the Durham Benevolent Bowl. At the end of the season they were renamed Esh Winning. The club's second season in the league saw them finish eleventh. After World War I the club continued in the Northern League, finishing bottom of the table in 1926–27, 1931–32 and 1933–34. In 1934 the club were forced to fold as they were unable to pay rent to the parish council; they resigned from the league on 5 October after four matches and their fixtures were taken over by West Auckland Town.

The modern club was established in 1967 as Esh Winning Pineapple. They joined Division Three of the Durham and District Sunday League, and were promoted to Division Two at the end of the 1970–71 season. The club won the Guards Cup in 1971–72 and the Division Two title in 1972–73. After winning the Stafferi Cup in 1974–75 and the Guards Cup again in 1975–76, they won successive league titles in 1978–79 and 1979–81. In 1981 the club joined the Northern Alliance. After a sixth-place finish in their first season in the league, they were promoted to Division Two of the Northern League, dropping "Pineapple" from their name.

Esh Winning remained in Division Two of the Northern League for twenty seasons, finishing bottom of the division in 1985–86 and 1989–90. In 2001–02 they finished third and were promoted to Division One, where they remained until being relegated back to Division Two at the end of the 2005–06 season. In 2007–08 the club won the Ernest Armstrong Memorial Cup. In 2008–09 another third-place finish in Division Two saw them promoted to Division One for a second time. However, they were relegated back to Division Two at the end of the 2010–11 season. They finished bottom of Division Two for a third time in 2013–14.

Season-by-season record

Ground
The original Esh Winning played at the Stags Head Recreation Ground. The ground's record attendance of over 5,000 was set in 1910 for a match against Newcastle United reserves and equalled in 1921 when the club lost 5–4 to Bishop Auckland in the FA Amateur Cup quarter final.

The modern club bought the welfare grounds in Waterhouses (a village to the south-west of Esh Winning) from the National Coal Board when the mine was about to be closed down. The West Terrace ground was subsequently developed, including a stand with five rows of seating and two covered standing areas.

Honours

Northern League
Champions 1912–13
Ernest Armstrong Memorial Cup winners 2007–08
Durham and District Sunday League
Champions 1978–79, 1979–80
Division Two champions 1972–73
Guards Cup winners 1971–72, 1975–76
Stafferi Cup winners 1974–75
Durham Benevolent Bowl
Winners 1912–13

Records
Best FA Cup performance: Second qualifying round, 1990–91, 2004–05
Best FA Vase performance: Second round, 1983–84, 1992–93, 2001–02, 2004–05, 2012–13
Record attendance:
Original club: 5,000 vs Newcastle United Reserves, 1910; vs Bishop Auckland, FA Amateur Cup quarter-final, 1921
Modern club: 1,500 vs Liverpool Fantail, FA Sunday Cup, 1982
Most appearances: Neil McLeary, 194
Most goals: Alan Dodsworth, over 250

See also
Esh Winning F.C. players

References

External links

Official website

Football clubs in England
Football clubs in County Durham
1967 establishments in England
Association football clubs established in 1967
Northern Football Alliance
Northern Football League